Christi Lynn McGarry (born 4 March 1990), simply known as Christi McGarry, is a Filipino-American beauty pageant titleholder from Jersey City, New Jersey, USA, recently crowned Binibining Pilipinas — Intercontinental 2015 at the Binibining Pilipinas 2015 pageant held on March 15, 2015, at the Smart Araneta Coliseum, Quezon City, Philippines.

Pageantry

Miss New Jersey Teen USA 2008
McGarry joined Miss New Jersey Teen USA 2008 pageant, an official state preliminary to Miss Teen USA 2008. She competed for the title, previously won by Alyssa Campanella, Miss Teen USA 2007 — 1st Runner Up. At the end of the pageant, she placed 1st Runner Up to Michelle Leonardo.

Mutya ng Pilipinas 2010
Prior to winning the Binibining Pilipinas Intercontinental 2015 title, McGarry won the Mutya ng Pilipinas — Asia Pacific 2010 crown, and was appointed to replace the original Philippine representative (Janina Lizardo, Mutya ng Pilipinas — Intercontinental 2010) to the Miss Intercontinental 2010 Pageant. She was chosen as one of the Top 15 and earning the Miss Intercontinental Continental Queen of Asia and the Pacific title as well.

Top Model of the World 2010
McGarry was also appointed by Mutya ng Pilipinas, Inc. as the official representative of the Philippines at the Top Model of the World 2010 pageant placing as Top 15 Semi-Finalist as well.

Binibining Pilipinas 2015
McGarry was Binibini #19 at Binibining Pilipinas 2015 pageant and eventually winning as Binibining Pilipinas — Intercontinental 2014 together with co-winners, Pia Wurtzbach (Miss Universe Philippines 2015), Janicel Lubina (Binibining Pilipinas — International 2015), Rogelie Catacutan (Binibining Pilipinas — Supranational 2015), and Ann Lorraine Colis (Binibining Pilipinas — Tourism 2015 and later appointed as Binibining Pilipinas — Globe 2015).

Miss Intercontinental 2015
Christi was the Philippines' official entry at the Miss Intercontinental 2015 pageant on December 18 in Magdeburg, Germany. She won 1st Runner-up and earning the Miss Intercontinental Continental Queen of Asia and Oceania title during the pageant proper.

Notes

References

External links
NY-based Pinay is RP's Top Model bet

Living people
American models of Filipino descent
American pageant participants of Filipino descent
Filipino people of American descent
People from Jersey City, New Jersey
People from Camarines Sur
Binibining Pilipinas winners
Mutya ng Pilipinas winners
Star Magic
1990 births